Caotun Township, formerly transliterated as Tsaotun Township, is an urban township in the northwest of Nantou County, Taiwan. It is the largest township in Taiwan by population.

History
The area was historically known as Chháu-ê-tun with the present name adopted under Japanese rule in 1920.

Administrative divisions
The township comprises 27 villages: Beishi, Beitou, Bifeng, Bizhou, Duihe, Fuliao, Fuxing, Heping, Jialao, Mingzheng, Nanpu, Pingding, Pinglin, Shanglin, Shanjiao, Shichuan, Shuangdong, Tucheng, Xincuo, Xinfeng, Xinzhuang, Yanfeng, Yufeng, Yushi, Zhongshan, Zhongyuan and Zhongzheng.

Education
 Nan Kai University of Technology
 National Caotun Commercial & Industrial Vocational Senior High School

Tourist attractions
 Caotun Night Market
 Jiujiufeng
 Taiwan Times Village
 Yu-hsiu Museum of Art

Transportation
The nearest train station to Caotun is the Yuanlin Station of the Taiwan Railway Administration in Changhua County.

Taichung City Bus route 108 have reach Nan Kai University of Technology, however 10km+10 TWD promotion are only applied to Taichung residents and eligible persons.

Notable natives
 Hsieh Ming-yu, singer and songwriter
 Tsai Ping-kun, Deputy Mayor of Taipei
 Wu Den-yih, Vice President of the Republic of China (2012-2016)

References

External links